Carl Lawrence Betz (March 9, 1921 – January 18, 1978) was an American stage, film, and television actor. He appeared in a variety of television series, including the CBS soap opera Love of Life; he is best remembered for playing Donna Reed's television husband, Dr. Alex Stone, from 1958 to 1966 in the ABC sitcom The Donna Reed Show. Then between 1967 and 1969, Betz played defense attorney Clinton Judd in ABC's courtroom drama Judd, for the Defense, winning an Emmy Award in 1969 for his work on that series.

Early years
Born in Pittsburgh, Pennsylvania, in 1921, Betz was the oldest of four children—two sons and two daughters—of Carl W. and Mary Leona Betz. His siblings (from oldest to youngest) were Mary Louise Betz, Leona Ruth Betz and William Harlow Betz.  His father was a native of Missouri; and according to the federal census of 1930, he was then the "chief chemist" at a local laboratory and later, by 1940, for Allegheny County. 

Growing up in the Pittsburgh suburbs of Crafton and Mt. Lebanon, Betz began his amateur acting career very early, at the age of 10, when he formed a theatrical company with six friends who performed plays in his grandmother's basement. After graduating from Mount St. Charles Academy in Rhode Island, he won a scholarship to Duquesne University. 

After the war, Betz returned to Carnegie Tech and earned a degree in drama. After graduation, he worked as a radio announcer and disk jockey before moving to New York City. Betz continued working in summer and winter stock companies and also worked for a while as a doorman at Radio City Music Hall.

Career

Betz made his Broadway debut in 1952 in The Long Watch, and toured with Veronica Lake in the summer stock play, The Voice of the Turtle. He then appeared for 18 months as Collie Jordan on Love of Life. Prior to his eight-year run on The Donna Reed Show, Betz made guest appearances on such television series as Sheriff of Cochise, Perry Mason, Gunsmoke (as “Nate Timble & Ned Glass”, an outlaw trying to go straight under an assumed name in the 1957 episode “Gone Straight”), The Millionaire, and Alfred Hitchcock Presents.

In 1958, Betz was cast as pediatrician Dr. Alex Stone in ABC sitcom The Donna Reed Show. The show revolves around the home and school problems of a middle-class American family in the late 1950s and mid 1960s. Alex was often called upon to rescue wife Donna Stone (Reed) from awkward situations and to monitor the behavior of their children, Mary (Shelley Fabares) and Jeff (Paul Petersen). Jeff Stone introduced the sentimental hit song "My Dad" in a 1962 episode, specifically singing the tune to Betz. The series was a hit for ABC and aired for eight seasons from September 1958 to March 1966. During the run of the series, Betz continued acting in stage roles during the show's hiatus. In 1964, he appeared as Reverend T. Lawrence Shannon in a limited stage run of The Night of the Iguana, for which he earned excellent reviews.

After The Donna Reed Show was cancelled, Betz returned to television roles and stage work. In 1967, producer Paul Monash offered Betz the role of defense lawyer Clinton Judd in the legal drama Judd, for the Defense. Monash had seen Betz's performance in Night of the Iguana in 1964 and was impressed with his acting. Betz initially thought the role was for a guest spot, but soon realized Monash had proposed that he star in a new series. Betz initially had misgivings, stating "I did not want to do another series, you get bored", but eventually relented, because he liked the scripts. The series, which premiered on ABC in September 1967, was praised by critics but struggled in the ratings. Shortly after ABC canceled the series in 1969, Betz won the Primetime Emmy Award for Outstanding Continued Performance by an Actor in a Leading Role in a Dramatic Series for his work on the series. He also made many guest appearances on a variety of popular television shows such as Mission: Impossible, The Mod Squad, Love, American Style, and Starsky & Hutch. One of his last roles was as General Douglas MacArthur in the one-man stage play I Shall Return.

Personal life and death
Betz was married twice and had one child. In June 1952 he married actress Lois Harmon with whom he had a son, Richard. The couple separated in May 1960 and divorced in 1961. In December 1963, Betz married Gloria Stone Martin, sister of actress Nita Talbot. Through his marriage to Martin, Betz had a stepdaughter, Rio. He and Gloria remained together for 15 years, until Carl's death.

In 1977, Betz was diagnosed with terminal and inoperable lung cancer. He kept his diagnosis private so he could keep working. On November 29, 1977, Betz entered Cedars-Sinai Medical Center in Los Angeles. He died seven weeks later, on January 18, 1978. His remains were cremated.

Broadway credits

Filmography

Awards and nominations

References

External links

1921 births
1978 deaths
20th-century American male actors
American radio DJs
American male film actors
United States Army personnel of World War II
American male soap opera actors
American male stage actors
American male television actors
Deaths from lung cancer in California
Carnegie Mellon University College of Fine Arts alumni
Duquesne University alumni
Golden Globe Award winners
Male actors from Pittsburgh
Outstanding Performance by a Lead Actor in a Drama Series Primetime Emmy Award winners
People from Mt. Lebanon, Pennsylvania
20th-century American male musicians
United States Army non-commissioned officers